The FIG Rhythmic Gymnastics Junior World Championships, are a rhythmic gymnastics competition organized by the International Gymnastics Federation (FIG). The inaugural edition was held in Moscow, Russia in July 2019. Subsequent championships are then to be held biannually in odd numbered years from 2021 onwards.

In May 2020, the FIG announced that there will be no Junior World Championships in 2021 in artistic or rhythmic gymnastics. FIG's executive committee reasoned the decision was made "to avoid overloading the 2021 calendar". The next Junior Worlds are planned for 2023, 4 years after the first editions.

To be eligible for the championships, girls must be between 13 and 15 years of age.

The programme of the junior worlds comprises eight disciplines, with eight sets of medals at stake.

Editions

Medalists

Group All-Around

All-time medal table

Last updated after the 2019 Junior World Championships.

References